American Ambulance, Great Britain (AAGB) (sometimes wrongly referred to as the Anglo-American Ambulance Unit) was a humanitarian organisation founded in 1940 by a group of Americans living in London for the purpose of providing emergency vehicles and ambulance crews to the United Kingdom during World War II. The idea for the service came from Gilbert H. Carr during a meeting of The American Society in London shortly after the Dunkirk evacuation.

Funding came from private donations, both from Americans expatriates living in the United Kingdom and from the United States and the organisation was headed by Wallace B. Phillips (Joseph P. Kennedy, then United States Ambassador to the United Kingdom, was Honorary Chairman). Within six weeks of being set up £140,000 had been raised. By the end of 1940 the organisation had raised $856,000.

American Ambulance, Great Britain eventually operated a fleet of around 300 vehicles.

Organisation

The American Ambulance, Great Britain, operated from 17 stations across mainland Britain with five located in London and one each in Cardiff, Cambridge, Birmingham, Bristol, Edinburgh, Glasgow, Leeds, Manchester, Newcastle, Nottingham, Reading and Tunbridge Wells.

For most of the War, the headquarters were at 9 Grosvenor Gardens in London, formerly the offices of The Pyrene Company Limited. In  March 1945 it moved to  44 Lower Belgrave Street.

Personnel
The ambulance staff were British women aged between 18 and 45 and numbered around 400, some of whom were seconded from the Mechanised Transport Corps (for Women) and the Women's Transport Services (FANY). Members of the AAGB wore the tunic and skirt uniform as worn by those in the FANY but with crossed British and American flags on the sleeve. All training was undertaken in Leeds.

During the course of the war, three members of the organisation were killed on active service:

 Officer Ensign, Marjorie Stewart Butler (née Pullar). On the 10 May 1941 the Alexandra Hotel, Knightsbridge received a bomb hit. Butler (one of the AAGB Headquarters staff) was in one of the first ambulances on the scene and went inside to help casualties. But part of the damaged building collapsed on her; she later died of her injuries.
 Driver H N Richardson.
 Driver Dorothy Helen Daly, killed on the 4 May 1942. The house she was billeted in on Spicer Road, Exeter was bombed during the Exeter Blitz. One other member of the AAGB was injured in the attack. Daly was the daughter of the Irish judge and politician Arthur Samuels.

Vehicles

All the AAGB's vehicles were painted grey with a red strip and an emblem featuring the British and American flags. Depending on the purpose several types of vehicle were operated by the AAGB
 Ambulances attended bombing incidents and transferred casualties to local hospitals and first aid posts. The vehicles were also used to transfer patients (often over great distance) requiring specialist treatment. Several types of vehicle were used - the Ford R.O.I.T, the Ford Clara a (converted panel van), the Austin K2/Y and Chevrolet Ambulances, based on American Chevrolet vans. A small number of ambulances built by Bedford were also operated.
 Mobile First-Aid Posts were adapted Fordson E83W vans. They were specially adapted to navigate along roads strewn with rubble and debris following an air raid. These units were able to treat several hundred casualties. These mobile units were accompanied by a truck carrying doctors, nurses and stretcher-bearers.
 Surgical Units were vehicles detailed to a local hospital. Their intended purpose was to transport medical teams to a bomb site. But they eventually became mostly used for moving casualties. These vehicles were mostly large American saloon cars.

Maintenance
The cost of maintaining the vehicles was met via subscriptions managed through the British War Relief Society of America.

Gallery of AAGB photographs

See also
American Ambulance Field Service
Hadfield-Spears Ambulance Unit
British War Relief Society
Friends' Ambulance Unit

References

External links
American Gift To Britain 1940 film from British Pathé archives
https://www.aagb.org.uk
https://www.facebook.com/AAGB1945/

1940 establishments in the United Kingdom
Civilians in war
United States military support organizations
United Kingdom–United States relations
Organizations established in 1940
United Kingdom home front during World War II